{{Infobox school
| name= Tantua International Group of Schools
| image= 
| latitude      = 
| longitude     = 
| dms           = 
| motto= "''Perseverance Conquers'| motto_translation= 
| streetaddress= Plot 2-6, 2nd Avenue Elekahia estate
| coordinates = 
| city= Port Harcourt
| state= Rivers State
| district= Elekahia estate
| county =
| zipcode= 500102
| country = Nigeria
| website= tantuaschools.com
| superintendent= 
| principal= Mr. Hilary
| founder       =Chief Ebikebina Tantua II
| schooltype= Private
| grades= 
| language= English
| area= Urban
| mascot= 
| gender                 = Mixed
| age_range              = 
| lower_age              = 11
| upper_age              = 18   
| teamname= 
| colors=    
| founded= 1986
| enrollment= 
| enrollment_as_of=
}}Tantua International Group of Schools''' is a private, coeducational day and boarding school located in Port Harcourt, Nigeria. It is situated within Elekahia Housing Estate, directly adjacent to the Liberation Stadium on stadium road Rumuomasi. Founded by Chief Ebikebina Tantua II in 1986, the school first operated as a nursery and primary school before its expansion to include a high school.

Academics
Tantua's high school program focuses mainly on science subjects, English Language, Mathematics and Information Technology. Also, the teaching of the aforementioned subjects are not just with theoretical; they come with practical classes that take place in the school's modern Physics, Chemistry, Biology and Agricultural Science laboratories. During first and second terms, all first year senior students (SS1) offer a total of 15 subjects which provide them with opportunities to select either arts, sciences or social science. At the end of third term, the students are organized into arts, sciences and social science classes.

See also
List of schools in Port Harcourt

References

External links
Tantua International Group of Schools website

Schools in Port Harcourt
Secondary schools in Rivers State
Boarding schools in Rivers State
Educational institutions established in 1986
Private schools in Rivers State
1986 establishments in Nigeria
1980s establishments in Rivers State